Der Ring des Polykrates (The Ring of Polykrates), Op. 7, is a one-act opera by Erich Wolfgang Korngold.

Performance history
Korngold composed the opera (his first) in 1914, when he was only seventeen years old. The one-act domestic comedy was contrasted by his second opera Violanta, a one-act tragedy. Both were successfully premiered together on 28 March 1916 at the National Theatre Munich. Bruno Walter conducted and the cast included Karl Erb and Maria Ivogün. The operas were repeated in Vienna, with Selma Kurz and Alfred Piccaver in Polykrates and Maria Jeritza as Violanta. In November 1916, it was given at the Dresden Hofoper, with Richard Tauber and Elisabeth Rethberg in the leading roles.

Roles

Synopsis
The librettist Leo Feld placed the story in the 18th century, when Friedrich Schiller's ballade of the same title was new.

The musician Wilhelm Arndt seems to have everything going for him: he is happily married to Laura, he has been appointed Hoffkapellmeister and he has just inherited a small fortune. Only the return of his long-lost friend Peter Vogel could make him even more happy. When Vogel actually returns, he is jealous of Wilhelm's happiness, and convinces him that in order not to challenge fate, he should sacrifice something (after the example set in Schiller's ballade Der Ring des Polykrates). Wilhelm starts an argument with his wife about her former life, but the couple's love is strong enough to overcome all difficulties. In the end, all agree that the sacrifice that has to be offered is the intriguer that tried to ruin their happiness: Peter Vogel has to leave again.

Recordings
In 1996 CPO released a 1995 recording, with Klauspeter Seibel conducting the Deutsches Symphonie-Orchester Berlin and singers Beate Bilandzija, Dietrich Henschel and Jürgen Sacher.

Piano music
A potpourri from Der Ring des Polykrates for piano arranged by L. Ruffin was recorded by Nimbus Records in 2001.

Bibliography
 Specht, Richard. Thematische Führer zu Erich W. Korngold's "Violanta" und "Der Ring des Polykrates". Mainz and Leipzig: B. Schott's Söhne, 1916. iv, 68 pp.

References

Operas by Erich Wolfgang Korngold
1916 operas
One-act operas
German-language operas
Operas
Operas based on plays